The "Career Girls Murders" was the name given by the media to the murders of Emily Hoffert and Janice Wylie in their apartment on the Upper East Side of Manhattan on August 28, 1963. George Whitmore Jr., was charged with this and other crimes, but later cleared.

The actions of the police department led Whitmore to be improperly accused of this and other crimes, including the murder of Minnie Edmonds and the attempted rape and assault of Elba Borrero. Whitmore was wrongfully incarcerated for 1,216 days — from his arrest on April 24, 1964, until his release on bond on July 13, 1966, and from the revocation of his bond on February 28, 1972 until his exoneration on April 10, 1973. This was after what author T.J. English called, in his book The Savage City, "a numbing cycle of trials, convictions, convictions overturned, retrials, and appeals", Whitmore was cleared of all charges and released. Whitmore's treatment by the authorities was cited as an example that led the U.S. Supreme Court to issue the guidelines known as the Miranda rights, with the Supreme Court calling Mr. Whitmore's case "the most conspicuous example" of police coercion in the country when it issued its 1966 ruling establishing a set of protections for suspects, including the right to remain silent, in Miranda v. Arizona.

Crimes
On August 28, 1963, the same day in which Martin Luther King Jr. gave his "I Have a Dream" speech in Washington, Patricia Tolles, 23, who worked at the book division at Time-Life, returned from work to her apartment on the third floor of 57 East 88th Street in Manhattan. There, she found the apartment ransacked and a bloody knife in the bathroom. Panicked, she ran to the building lobby and called Max Wylie, the father of her roommate, who lived nearby.  He came to investigate, and in one of the bedrooms he found the bodies of his daughter, Janice, 21, and her roommate, Emily Hoffert, 23, next to a bloodied bed by the windows.  They were tied together with strips of cloth and had been stabbed repeatedly with three knives from their own kitchen.  Wylie had been stabbed in the chest and lower abdomen, the latter wounds causing partial evisceration, while Hoffert had been knifed in the neck. Hoffert's body was fully clothed, but Wylie's was nude and there was evidence she had been sexually assaulted.

Wylie was the daughter of advertising executive and novelist Max Wylie and niece of novelist Philip Wylie, while Hoffert was the daughter of a Minneapolis surgeon, so they both belonged to prominent families, leading the case to create a press sensation. The media dubbed it the "Career Girls Murders" because Wylie worked as a Newsweek researcher and Emily was a schoolteacher.  As such, they were representative of the thousands of young women who had come from all over America to New York and other larger cities to seek jobs and careers. Others like them now felt unsafe and the police were under pressure to solve the case. Hundreds of detectives were assigned to the investigation and thousands of people were interviewed, but as the weeks went by no arrests were made.

Investigation
Initially, police believed that the victims knew their killer. The level of violence found is usually an indication of a personal relationship with the victim. There were no signs of forced entry and the apartment, which was on the third floor of a nine-story building, was also guarded by a doorman. Though the apartment was in disarray, nothing appeared to be stolen, so robbery was not believed to be a motive. The victims' hands and feet were bound and then they were tied back-to-back to each other while Wylie was nude and Hoffert was dressed. Two bloody 10-  to 12-inch carving knives were found next to the bodies and an additional knife in one of the two bathrooms.

Police theorized that the women were attacked and murdered in the bedroom where their bodies were discovered. They did not immediately release information regarding the rape of Wylie. In fact, they told the press that it did not appear that either had been raped, but allowed that an autopsy might reveal otherwise. They did say that the women had been slashed repeatedly in the neck and abdomen. The focus on interviewing the people named in Wylie's green address book did not lead to identifying a suspect. A $10,000 reward was established to aid in the apprehension of a culprit.

Janice Wylie's father, Max Wylie, penned a book "Career Girl, Watch Your Step!", a year after the murders, warning career girls of safety and the need to be aware and "feel threatened" as a defense.

Like Max Wylie, everyone initially believed that the attacks were against women who had careers, as both of the victims fit that profile. Women, specifically white women, were left to feel vulnerable despite their desire to gain freedom and independence through their careers.

Many other handbooks, aimed at the safety of single women, were written as an aftermath and issued by local police departments and public safety departments. These handbooks mostly emphasized the importance of prevention of the attacks including having male protection and needing physical security.

Wrong suspect
In April the following year, Elba Borrero identified George Whitmore Jr., a nineteen-year-old day laborer, as the man who had attempted to rape her a few days prior. Borrero would later acknowledge that Whitmore was the only suspect police had shown her.

When Whitmore was arrested, it was found that he was in possession of a photo of a white blonde woman. Brooklyn detectives Joe DiPrima and Edward Bulger  jumped to the conclusion that the blonde in the photo was Janice Wylie, although her family denied it. The photo was that of Arlene Franco, a high school classmate of Whitmore, living in New Jersey, who had lost or discarded it in a park, where Whitmore found it and for some reason decided to keep it in his wallet. Whitmore immediately became a suspect in the Wylie and Hoffert double murder. Detectives DiPrima and Bulger proceeded to question Whitmore about the Wylie-Hoffert murders and after hours of leading questions Whitmore finally confessed.

New York City police announced that Whitmore had confessed to the murders of Wylie and Hoffert, as well as the murder of Minnie Edmonds (an unrelated murder) and the attempted rape of Borrero. The NYPD announced Whitmore had given details of the Wylie-Hoffert killings which only the murderer could have known, but Manhattan prosecutors noticed that every detail in the Whitmore confession was known to the police beforehand. Police stated he had drawn a detailed diagram of the apartment and had in his wallet a photo of Janice Wylie that had been stolen from the flat.

Whitmore repudiated his confessions, claiming he had been beaten during the interrogations; that counsel had not been present; and that his request for a lie detector test had been denied. Witnesses were located claiming Whitmore had been in Wildwood, New Jersey at the time of the Manhattan murders, watching a live TV broadcast speech of Martin Luther King Jr. at the March on Washington, 159 miles away from the crime scene. Despite Whitmore's discredited confession, New York County District Attorney Frank Hogan did not dismiss the indictment against him.

New leads

On October 9, 1964, Nathan "Jimmy" Delaney (aged 35), a drug user and small-time dealer, was arrested for the murder of a rival drug dealer, Roberto Cruz del Valle. Facing the death penalty, Delaney offered to make a deal: in return for leniency, he would give police the name of the real "career girls" killer, and he claimed it was not Whitmore.

Delaney explained to police that on the day of the killings he had met an old acquaintance, Richard "Ricky" Robles, who had told him that he had committed the murders of Wylie and Hoffert. Robles, a 22-year-old burglar, had a long record of drug use and had been released from prison just two months prior to the murders. To support his habit, Robles needed anywhere from $30 to $50 per day.

Delaney told detectives that Robles had turned up at his apartment on the day of the killings demanding drugs while his hands and clothes were covered in blood. The shaken Robles told Delaney, “I just iced two dames.” His clothes had blood spatters on them; Delaney gave him a shirt and a pair of pants to change into. Delaney said he then went out to buy drugs with money Robles had given him.

Delaney and his wife, Marjorie, were fitted with wires and wires were also installed in their and Robles' apartments. Over time, Robles talked about details of the murders that convinced investigators he was the real killer; he was arrested and charged on January 26, 1965.

Second arrest and conviction
In the autumn of 1965, Robles was tried for the Wylie-Hoffert murders. His attorneys attempted to buoy the credibility of Whitmore's Wylie-Hoffert confession to create a reasonable doubt that their own client had committed the crime. However, prosecutor John F. Keenan replied by summoning Whitmore and the detectives who had arrested him. Robles' attorneys were unable to translate doubts about police interrogation methods to their own client's advantage, despite testimony that Robles had confessed to the Wylie-Hoffert murders while suffering from heroin withdrawal and without his attorney present.

Delaney testified that Robles told him the motive for the murders was because Hoffert told him that she could identify him to police. It was pointed out by Robles' attorney that Delaney was given immunity in exchange for his testimony.

On December 1, 1965, Robles was found guilty of the murders of Emily Hoffert and Janice Wylie and sentenced to life in prison. Just months before, the New York Legislature had abolished the death penalty, except in the cases of the killing of police officers, prison guards, and murders committed while escaping jail. He was found guilty, largely on the basis of secretly tape-recorded conversations about the murders. Despite the conviction of Robles, numerous questions regarding the police conduct, in this case, were left unanswered. 
"Police detectives, who may have been motivated by their sense of justice, resorted to highly questionable means to extract a confession from a suspect who was too weak to resist. Their colossal blunders in the career girls murder case almost put George Whitmore Jr. on death row for a crime he certainly did not commit. No formal charges were ever brought against Detectives Bulger and DiPrima who consistently denied any wrongdoing in the case, but exactly how Whitmore was able to supply a 61-page confession to a double murder he never committed was never explained."

Robles, who had himself publicly protested his innocence over the original double-murders, did not admit his guilt until a parole board hearing in November 1986. He admitted he had broken into the apartment to obtain money for drugs and had assumed at first it was empty. When Wylie, who had been taking a shower, appeared, he attacked and raped her. Hoffert had turned up shortly afterward and he attacked her as well. Defiantly, she told him that she would remember his face and report him to the police, whereupon he murdered both her and Wylie. The three-member panel rejected granting parole, citing "the nature of the crime". No charges were pressed against the police officers who had obtained Whitmore's "confessions".

Legacy
The case of Whitmore and his treatment by the police was one of many examples used by the US Supreme Court when it issued the guidelines known as the Miranda rights in June 1966 by which, when a defendant is taken into custody and accused of a crime, he must be advised of his constitutional rights. The court acknowledged that coercive interrogations could produce false confessions, and in a footnote stated: [t]he most conspicuous example occurred in New York in 1964 when a Negro of limited intelligence confessed to two brutal murders and a rape which he had not committed.

When this was discovered, the prosecutor  was reported as saying: "Call it what you want — brain-washing, hypnosis, fright. The only thing I don't believe is that Whitmore was beaten."

Janice Wylie's mother and sister, Isobel Wylie and Pamela Wylie Sullivan, respectively, both died within five years of the murders, the former from cancer. Max Wylie committed suicide by gunshot in 1975 in Fredericksburg, Virginia.

Whitmore made a life for himself in Wildwood, New Jersey. He successfully sued for false arrest and was awarded $500,000 from the City of New York. He operated a commercial fishing boat for a time, but he was later disabled in a boating accident. He blew through the award money, was unemployed for long stretches, and suffered from depression and alcoholism. Whitmore never married, but was the father of four daughters and two sons. George Whitmore Jr. died on October 8, 2012,  in a nursing home of a heart attack. He was 68 years old.

Richard Robles was released on parole in May 2020. Prior to this, he was New York State Inmate #66A0003, imprisoned in the Greene Correctional Facility and denied parole multiple times. While in jail, Robles taught fellow prisoners computer skills and received an associate degree.

In popular culture
 The case served as the basis of the 1973 television movie The Marcus-Nelson Murders, which in turn served as a pilot for the crime drama series Kojak.
 A 1973 novel titled The Killings, by Edgar-winning author Clark Howard, also fictionalized the case, changing the setting from NYC to Los Angeles.
 In a 2009 episode of Mad Men (season 3, episode 9, "Wee Small Hours"), two characters hear the beginning of a radio broadcast, in which the newscaster reports that the bodies of the victims, Wylie and Hoffert, had been found in their apartment.
 The case was revisited in 2013 in Investigation Discovery's series A Crime to Remember (Season 1, Episode 2, "The Career Girl Murders").

References

External links
  The Savage City: Race, Murder, and a Generation on the Edge by T.J. English

1963 in New York City
1963 murders in the United States
1960s in Manhattan
American murder victims
Deaths by stabbing in New York (state)
Female murder victims
Kojak
People murdered in New York City
August 1963 events in the United States
Women in New York City
History of women in New York City